HALE may refer to:
 Healthy life expectancy, statistics defined as the average number of years that a person can expect to live in "full health"
 High-altitude long endurance, a description of an air-borne vehicle which functions optimally at high-altitude

See also
 Hale (disambiguation)